Microperittia is an extinct genus of moths in the family Elachistidae. It was described by Kozlov in 1987. It contains the species M. proboscifera, which was described from Baltic amber, more specifically Priabonian terrestrial amber in the Russian Federation.

References

Fossil taxa described in 1987
Fossil Lepidoptera
†
Prehistoric insects of Europe